Kampong Panchor Dulit (Malay for Panchor Dulit Village) is a village in Tutong District, Brunei, within the mukim of Pekan Tutong. The postcode for Kampong Panchor Dulit is TA2141.

References 

Panchor Dulit